Carola Baleztena (10 January 1980, Madrid) is a Spanish actress.

Her most notable role was playing Natalia, the protagonist of the youth soap opera Nada es para siempre (1999-2000).

She is the granddaughter of Navarrese folk customs expert Ignacio Baleztena Ascárate.

Personal life
She married in 2011 with a businessman whom she had 2 daughters, they later divorced. In 2016 she married jeweler Emiliano Suárez.

Filmography

Television
Menudo es mi padre (1997).
Fernández y familia  (199]), as Marta.
Nada es para siempre (1999-2000), as Natalia.Paraíso (2000-2001).Al salir de clase (2001-2002) as Lucía.Luna negra (2003-200]), as Maite Padilla.El inquilino (2004), 4 episodes.El comisario (2005), 2 episodes, as Isa.Planta 25 (2006-2008), as Irene.Yo soy Bea (2008-2009), many episodes.Filmaniac (2010-2014), as hostVer cine (2014-present), as host

CineDiario de una becaria (2003), as Beatriz.El chocolate del loro (2004), as Sobrina.Torrente 3: El protector (2005), como Araceli.Las tierras altas (2008), as Julia''.

References

External links

1980 births
Living people
Spanish television actresses
Spanish television presenters
Spanish women television presenters